Barnehurst is a town and electoral ward in South East London within the London Borough of Bexley. It lies north east of Bexleyheath, and 13.0 miles (20 km) east south-east of Charing Cross. It is separated from North Bexleyheath by the A220, Erith Road.

History

The town came into being after the sale of land in 1881 to build the Bexleyheath loop line between Lewisham and Dartford.

Barnehurst's name originates from the name of the railway station, which was so-named after Colonel Barne, who owned a local property, May Place House (and was vice-chairman of the railway company).

As in much of suburban London, Barnehurst railway station was opened to encourage building of houses. The Barnehurst Estate was built in 1926 and other building, mainly by W.H. Wedlock followed in the years after. A key landmark, just west of the station, is the Red Barn pub, a venue important to the survival of jazz in Britain immediately following the Second World War, largely due to the enthusiasm of pianist George Webb. 

In 1920 the area became part of the Crayford Urban District of Kent. In 1965, under the London Government Act 1963, the urban district was abolished and its area transferred to Greater London to form part of the present-day London Borough of Bexley.

Politics
Most of Barnehurst is in the Barnehurst ward of the London Borough of Bexley. Two elected councillors represent the ward on the borough council. The northernmost part of Barnehurst is in Colyers ward and part of one road, Eversley Avenue, lies within North End ward.

Education

Sport and leisure

Barnehurst has a Non-League football club Phoenix Sports F.C., which plays at Phoenix Sports Ground.

Transport and locale

Nearest places
Bexleyheath
Crayford 
Northumberland Heath
Slade Green
Barnes Cray

Rail
Barnehurst station serves the area, with Southeastern services to London Victoria, London Charing Cross and Dartford.

Buses
Several bus routes serve the area, all provided by Transport for London. These connect Barnehurst with areas including Bexleyheath, Blackheath, Erith, Lewisham, Sidcup, Thamesmead, Welling and Woolwich.

Religious sites

 Saint Martin's, The parish church of Barnehurst 
 Barnehurst Methodist Church
 Lyndhurst Chapel 
 Selah Independent Baptist Church

References

External links
History of Barnehurst
Bexley Local Studies Note 14 'Barnehurst' – a local history
Profile from Hidden London
Map of Crayford Urban District
Reference to the death of George Webb, jazzman, in 2010

Areas of London
Districts of the London Borough of Bexley